High Storrs School is a mixed secondary school and sixth form college with academy status located on the south-western outskirts of Sheffield, England. The main school building is Grade II listed. It moved to its current site in 1933. The school does not have a set uniform, instead allowing students to wear what they like as long as it follows the dress code.

Admissions
High Storrs has a Sixth Form in Ecclesall and is a specialist Arts College in the Performing Arts, with a secondary specialism in Maths and Computing.

History

Central Technical School
The school opened on 10 March 1880 as the Sheffield Central Technical School in the centre of Sheffield. Its first headmaster was Mr. A. F. McBean. It built a new Science wing in 1895 and began providing science teaching for boys only. In 1904, the school became officially recognised as a secondary school. In 1906, the school was divided into two schools, one for boys and one for girls. It relocated to its present site at High Storrs in 1933. The Old Centralians was an association for former pupils that operated until 2015.

Grammar school
The building housed two separate grammar schools from the 1940s to 1968: High Storrs Grammar School for Boys, and High Storrs Grammar School for Girls. It was administered by the Sheffield Education Committee. The buildings were improved in the early 1960s.

Comprehensive
These were merged into a single comprehensive school, starting in September 1969 with around 1,600 boys and girls.

In 1993 a 17-year-old pupil was killed by a wound from a bayonet by a pupil of Notre Dame High School in Sheffield in Endcliffe Park.

Renovation 
Almost £27 million was allocated for a complete refurbishment and remodelling of the school under the Government's Building Schools for the Future programme, with £2 million being spent on ICT equipment. Due to the school's Grade II listed status, only the interior of the main school building could be refurbished, with the exterior remaining almost unchanged. A new extension was built at the north end of the building to replace the old dining rooms, school hall and performing arts block, whilst a second extension was built to replace the 1960s additions at the south end of the school. This included a modern sports hall. Preparatory work on the field ready for the new temporary teaching rooms began in July 2008. Demolition of the 1960s extensions to the north of the school was completed in November 2008, and the project was completed in 2011. A grand opening event was held at the school on 17 September 2011, shortly after the school year had begun. At the event, the school launched their new commemorative book, titled High Storrs The Journey, which celebrated the school's history. It was sold for £9.99 to raise money for the school. There were also speeches from David Blunkett, former MP for Sheffield Brightside and Hillsborough.

Post-renovation 
On 14 July 2016, the school announced that Claire Tasker was taking over from Ian Gage, the outgoing headteacher. At the time, Tasker was a co-head at Tapton School. She took over from Gage at the start of the 2016–17 academic year.

On 1 March 2018, the chair of the school's governing body and the headteacher jointly announced in a statement on the school website that it had become an academy and a member of the Minerva Learning Trust.

Houses 
In 2008 the "Key Stage" system was changed to the Vertical System, where instead of year groups, there are houses with ten forms to each house. Each form has a varied number of pupils from Y7-11 and no sixth formers. There are 2 classes of around 30 in each house, so 8 classes. Forms 1–5 are a class and forms 6–10 are a class. This only applies to most classes in Y7 and Y8. This system is meant to reduce bullying and encourage friendships with pupils of different ages. The four houses are named after the main four theatres in Sheffield: Crucible, Lyceum, Merlin and Montgomery.

The houses also compete against each other in sporting events such as its annual sports day, held at the English Institute of Sport.

Curriculum

In Y7 and Y8, students receive 3 hours each of Maths, English and Science a week. They also receive 2 hours of French, PE, Design and Technology/Food Tech (students typically receive 30 weeks of D&T and 10 weeks of Food Tech a year), History and Geography and 1 lesson a week of PSHCEE and RE. Students also receive a lesson of ICT a week, however this is taught on a rotary basis in Y7, with the other half of the year spent learning Classics. Drama, Art, Music and Dance are also taught on a rotary basis in both years, with Y7s receiving one hour of Dance/Drama and two hours of Art/Music. Y8s, however receive one hour of Dance/Music and two hours of Art/Drama. English, Maths, Science, PSCHEE and PE are mandatory for the whole of KS4, whilst RE is only mandatory for Y9.

Phone zones policy 
Unlike many other schools, High Storrs allows mobile phone usage on the school premises, as long as it is within one of their phone zones. The areas where mobile phone use is permitted include the Piazza, Field, Dining Room and within classrooms so long as the teacher has given permission to use them. Use outside phone zones is prohibited and may result in confiscation. Use of headphones are also prohibited anywhere on the school site unless they are required for the lesson.

Exam pass rate 
In 2019 66.4% of pupils who took GCSE exams achieved grade 5 or above in Maths and English.
The average points score for AS and A2 Level students in 2008 was 675.8, below the national average of 739.8.

It gets above-average GCSE results and A-levels at the England average.

Former teachers
 Veronica Hardstaff, Labour MEP 1994–1999 for Lincolnshire and Humberside South and Sheffield City Councillor 1970–1978 and 2002–2007, taught French and German at the girls' school 1963–1966.

Notable former pupils

 Nick Matthew, squash player
 Jessica-Jane Clement, television presenter
 Tom Ellis, actor
 Leslie Evans, Permanent Secretary to the Scottish Government
 Jayne Irving, GMTV presenter
 Jack Lester, footballer
 Chloe Newsome, actress
 Jessica Ransom, actress
 Kyle Walker, Manchester City FC & England footballer
 Michael Jolley, football manager
 Steve Heighway, Ex Liverpool footballer
 Grace Clough, paralympic rower
 Esme Morgan, Manchester City footballer

High Storrs Grammar School for Girls

 Judith Bingham, composer
 Janet Brown, Chief executive since 2007 of the Scottish Qualifications Authority, and managing director from 2000 to 2007 of Scottish Enterprise
 Stella Greenall, involved in the introduction of student grants in 1962
 Tessa Bramley, Michelin-starred chef

High Storrs Grammar School for Boys

 Joseph Ashton OBE, Labour MP from 1968 to 2001 for Bassetlaw
 Peter Glossop, opera singer
 Steve Heighway, footballer
 Paul Heiney, BBC reporter
 Very Rev Alfred Jowett, Dean of Manchester from 1964 to 1983
 Jeff Rawle, actor

References

External links 
 High Storrs School Website
  Ofsted Report (2005)
  Ofsted Report (2008)
Ofsted Report (2022)
 EduBase

Secondary schools in Sheffield
Educational institutions established in 1933

1933 establishments in England
Academies in Sheffield